Lidiya Petrovna Sukharevskaya (30 August 1909 – 11 October 1991) was a Soviet stage actress and playwright renowned for her work with Nikolay Akimov and Andrey Goncharov. Her frequent stage partner was Boris Tenin, her husband. She also appeared in 14 films between 1939 and 1981. Sukharevskaya was named a People's Artist of the USSR in 1990.

Selected filmography
 We from the Urals (1943)
 Encounter at the Elbe (1949)
 Girl No. 217 (1945)
 Mussorgsky (1950)
 Rimsky-Korsakov (1952)
 The Star (1953)
 Kain XVIII (1963)
 Anna Karenina (1967)

References

External links

1909 births
1991 deaths
Actresses from Saint Petersburg
People from Petergof
Soviet film actresses
Stalin Prize winners
People's Artists of the USSR
Honored Artists of the RSFSR
People's Artists of the RSFSR
20th-century Russian actresses